Brain Surgeons were an American rock band featuring Albert Bouchard formerly of Blue Öyster Cult, vocalist Deborah Frost, and guitarist Ross the Boss formerly of the Dictators and Manowar.

They formed in 1994 and originally centered on the nucleus of Bouchard and Frost; at one point, Tommy Hilfiger's brother Billy Hilfiger was their guitarist. However, Billy Hilfiger was later diagnosed with and died of brain cancer. They underwent several lineup changes over the course of the band's lifetime, and these affected the stylistic bent of the music. The band released their last studio album, Denial of Death, in 2006, and disbanded later that year.

Former members
Albert Bouchard − lead vocals, drums
Deborah Frost − lead vocals, rhythm guitar
Ross the Boss − lead guitar
David Hirschberg − bass guitar, vocals
Peter Bohovesky − guitar, vocals
Billy Hilfiger − guitar

Discography

References

External links
Home of Cellsum Records
Brain Surgeons on Myspace

Heavy metal musical groups from New York (state)
Musical groups from Long Island
Musical groups established in 1994
1994 establishments in New York (state)